Ancistroceroides is a neotropical and nearctic genus of potter wasps.

Species
 Ancistroceroides acuminatus
 Ancistroceroides alastoroides
 Ancistroceroides ambiguus
 Ancistroceroides atripes
 Ancistroceroides bogotanus
 Ancistroceroides conjunctus
 Ancistroceroides cordatus
 Ancistroceroides cruentus
 Ancistroceroides domingensis
 Ancistroceroides erythraeus
 Ancistroceroides fabienii
 Ancistroceroides fulvimaculatus
 Ancistroceroides gribodoi
 Ancistroceroides latro
 Ancistroceroides mearimensis
 Ancistroceroides rufimaculatus
 Ancistroceroides rufus
 Ancistroceroides venustus
 Ancistroceroides vicinus

References

Potter wasps